The Chesapeake Colonies were the Colony and Dominion of Virginia, later the Commonwealth of Virginia, and Province of Maryland, later Maryland, both colonies located in British America and centered on the Chesapeake Bay. Settlements of the Chesapeake region grew slowly due to diseases such as malaria. Most of these settlers were male immigrants from England who died soon after their arrival. Due to the majority of men, eligible women did not remain single for long. The native-born population eventually became immune to the Chesapeake diseases and these colonies were able to continue through all the hardships.

The Chesapeake region had a one-crop economy, based on tobacco. This contributed to the demand for slave labor in the Southern colonies. The tobacco also depleted nutrients in the soil, and new land was continually needed for its cultivation. White indentured servants were also common in this region early in its settlement, gradually being replaced by African slaves by the latter half of the seventeenth century due to improved economic conditions in Europe and the resulting decrease in emigration to the Chesapeake region. Indentured servants were people who signed a contract of indenture requiring them to work for their Chesapeake masters for an average of five to seven years, in return for the cost of the Atlantic crossing. When finished, they might be given land, or goods consisting of a suit of clothes, some farm tools, seed, and perhaps a gun.

See also
Atlantic Creole
British colonization of North America
Colonial families of Maryland
Colonial South and the Chesapeake
First Families of Virginia
History of White Americans in Baltimore
Old Stock Americans
Province of Maryland
Thirteen Colonies
Middle Colonies
New England Colonies
Southern Colonies
Tobacco colonies

References

Mark C. Carnes & John A. Garraty, The American Nation: A History of the United States, Pearson Education, 2006.

-03
Chesapeake Bay
Province of Maryland
Colony of Virginia
English colonization of the Americas
History of slavery in Virginia
History of the Thirteen Colonies
History of the Southern United States
Former British colonies and protectorates in the Americas